Gravesend Race Track at Gravesend in Brooklyn, New York was a Thoroughbred horse racing facility that opened in 1886 and closed in 1910. The track was built by the Brooklyn Jockey Club with the backing of Philip and Michael Dwyer, two wealthy racing stable owners known as the Dwyer Brothers. Philip, the controlling shareholder of the Brooklyn Jockey Club, served as its president.

Gravesend Race Track hosted the Preakness Stakes for fifteen years.

History
Opened on August 26, 1886, its first executive board consisted of: 
 Col. William L. Scott
 James Ben Ali Haggin
 Michael F. Dwyer
 Elias J. "Lucky" Baldwin
 Capt. Samuel S. Brown

The facility covered an area which extended from McDonald Avenue (then Gravesend Avenue) to Ocean Parkway, and from Kings Highway to Avenue U. This land had previously been occupied by the Prospect Park Fair Grounds, a slightly smaller and far more modest race course which had been used for harness racing. The facility was enclosed by a twelve-foot wooden fence and boasted an ornate two-story "double decker" grand stand of yellow Georgia pine with a bar and restaurant built into its brick base. A spur was created that allowed trains running along the Prospect Park & Coney Island railroad line to stop within the facility and discharge passengers at a small station that led directly to the grand stand via a covered walkway. At the southern end of the facility stood the offices of the Brooklyn Jockey Club, as well as the dressing rooms for the jockeys. The northern end was occupied by the betting pavilion and carriage sheds. The eastern side, which ran along the tree-lined boulevard of Ocean Parkway (where impromptu training races often took place), was occupied by the clubhouse.

During its time, the racetrack executive included superintendent Ben Brush in whose honor the future U.S. Racing Hall of Fame horse Ben Brush was named. Among the major graded stakes races launched at the track were the Astoria Stakes, Brooklyn Handicap, Brooklyn Derby, Tremont Stakes, and the Gazelle Handicap. For the fifteen years from 1894 through 1908, Gravesend Race Track hosted one of the American Classic Races, the Preakness Stakes.

In 1908, the administration of Governor Charles Evans Hughes signed into law the Hart–Agnew bill that effectively banned all racetrack betting in New York State. A 1910 amendment to the legislation added further restrictions that meant by 1911 all racetracks in the state ceased operations. Although the law was repealed in time to resume racing in 1913, the Gravesend Race Track never reopened and the land was eventually sold to real-estate developers in 1920.

Today, the annual Gravesend Handicap at Aqueduct Racetrack honors the former racing facility.

Thoroughbred stakes races at Gravesend Race Track

Flat races

 Albemarle Stakes
 Astoria Stakes
 Bedford Stakes
 Broadway Stakes
 Brookdale Handicap
 Brooklyn Handicap
 Carlton Stakes
 Clover Stakes
 Criterion Stakes
 Culver Handicap
 Brooklyn Derby
 Expectation Stakes
 Flatlands Stakes 
 First Special Stakes
 Second Special Stakes
 Gazelle Handicap 
 Great American Stakes
 Hanover Stakes
 Holly Stakes
 Hudson Stakes
 Junior Champion Stakes
 Manhanset Stakes
 Myrtle Stakes
 Occidental Handicap
 Oriental Handicap
 Parkway Handicap
 Patchogue Stakes
 Preakness Stakes
 Prospect Handicap
 Seabreeze Stakes
 Speculation Stakes
 Standard Stakes
 Tremont Stakes
 Willow Handicap

Steeplechase races
 Greater New York Steeplechase Handicap
 Hitchcock Steeplechase Handicap

Other defunct New York race tracks 
 Brighton Beach Race Course
 Jamaica Race Course
 Jerome Park Racetrack
 Morris Park Racecourse
 Roosevelt Raceway
 Sheepshead Bay Race Track
 Union Course

References

External links
 Video from the Library of Congress of the 1904 Brooklyn Handicap at Gravesend Race Track

 
Defunct horse racing venues in New York City
Sports venues in Brooklyn
Gravesend, Brooklyn
1886 establishments in New York (state)
1911 disestablishments in New York (state)
Sports venues completed in 1886